Hermanos Gutiérrez (Spanish for "Gutiérrez Brothers") is a Swiss Latin instrumental band formed in 2015 in Zürich by Ecuadorian-Swiss brothers Alejandro Gutiérrez (guitar and lap steel) and Estevan Gutiérrez (guitar and percussion). In 2022, the US label Easy Eye Sound released the band's fifth album, El Bueno y el Malo.

History

Alejandro and Estevan Gutiérrez, two of four siblings, were raised by an Ecuadorian mother and a Swiss father in Switzerland, but often visited family in Playas, Ecuador. Around age nine, Estevan learned to play classical guitar in Latin styles such as milonga and salsa, and as a surfer was later inspired by surf rocker Jack Johnson. Alejandro, who is eight years younger, taught himself guitar by watching tutorial videos on YouTube. The Hermanos Gutiérrez band traces its origins to a memorable jam session in Alejandro's apartment in Zürich during a visit from Estevan in 2015.

The band's first three albums (8 Años, El Camino de mi Alma, and Hoy Como Ayer) drew broadly from the world of Latin music. A visit to Mexico and the Southwest US in February 2020 inspired their fourth album, Hijos del Sol, which incorporated more Western sounds. An eight-minute music video for the title track came out in advance of the album's release on 25 September 2020.

El Bueno y el Malo, the band's first non-indie project, was recorded in Nashville in collaboration with Dan Auerbach of the Black Keys and released by his label Easy Eye Sound on 28 October 2022. The album (and its title) were inspired by Ennio Morricone's The Good, the Bad and the Ugly soundtrack. The album was critically acclaimed and has been described as mentally transporting listeners to Spaghetti Western landscapes. Songs from El Bueno y el Malo comprised Hermanos Gutiérrez's set list in an NPR Tiny Desk Concert in January 2023. That year, Auerbach was nominated for the Grammy Award for Non-Classical Producer of the Year in part for his work with Hermanos Gutiérrez.

Musical style

The band's genre has evolved into a mix of Latin and Western music. Rolling Stone describes the band's "minimal approach to their instrumental guitar music ... It's music that sings without needing a singer, that's lyrical without needing words". The Santa Fe New Mexican writes that the band's songs "alternate between shuffling and brooding, spooky and solitary".

Alejandro Gutiérrez plays electric guitar and lap steel guitar, while Estevan Gutiérrez plays electric guitar and percussion (bongos, maracas, etc.). The brothers have described having a musical chemistry such that they are able to compose together without needing to talk; NPR writes, "They weave intricate guitar lines over each other that intertwine to the point that if you close your eyes you can't tell where one begins and the other ends". Of their proficiency with "rhythm and timing", Auerbach has jokingly commented, "They are Swiss".

Early influences include Julio Jaramillo; later influences include film composers such as Ennio Morricone and Gustavo Santaolalla.

Discography
Adapted from Bandcamp

Studio albums

Compilation albums

References

External links

Sibling musical duos
2015 establishments in Switzerland
Ecuadorian musical groups
Swiss musical duos
Latin music groups
Western music (North America)